Walter Dryden (3 July 1864 – 11 July 1892) was a New Zealand cricketer. He played in one first-class match for Wellington in 1885/86.

See also
 List of Wellington representative cricketers

References

External links
 

1864 births
1892 deaths
New Zealand cricketers
Wellington cricketers
Cricketers from Wellington City